LTC may refer to:

Organizations 
 Lakeshore Technical College,  Cleveland, Wisconsin, US
 Latino Theater Company, Los Angeles, California, US
 Licensed Trade Charity, UK
 Linear Technology Corporation, Milpitas, California, US
 Linux Technology Center, in IBM
 London Transit Commission, Ontario, Canada

Science, technology, and medicine 
 Linear timecode, encoded in audio signal
 Long-term care, of the chronically ill
 Litecoin, a peer-to-peer digital currency

Other uses 
 Leave Travel Concession; see LTC Scam
 Light timber construction schools, Australia
 Lieutenant colonel in the US Army
 License To Carry firearms in some US states (concealed carry in the United States)
 Load Tap Changer, for adjusting transformer voltage at substations.
 Losing-Trick Count, for evaluating bridge hands
 ltc, the ISO 639-3 and Linguist List code for Middle Chinese